The Dodge City Conquistadors are the sports teams of Dodge City Community College located in Dodge City, Kansas, United States. They participate in the National Junior College Athletic Association (NJCAA) and in the Kansas Jayhawk Community College Conference.

Sports

Men's sports
Baseball
Basketball
Cross country
Football
Golf
Rodeo
Soccer
Track & field

Women's sports
Basketball
Cross country
Golf
Rodeo
Soccer
Softball
Track & field
Volleyball

Facilities
Dodge City Community College has four athletics facilities.
 Cavalier Field – home of the Conqs baseball team
 Legends Field – home of the Lady Conqs softball team
 Memorial Stadium – home of the Conqs football and soccer teams
 DCCC Student Activity Center – home  of the Conqs men's and women's basketball teams, and the volleyball team

Notable alumni

 Larry Brown, NFL running back, winner of the 1972 NFL Most Valuable Player Award
 Edawn Coughman, football player
 Pete Emelianchik, tight end and special teams player for the Philadelphia Eagles
 Robelyn Garcia, All-time Dodge City Conquistador career scorer, former professional WBA 4X All-Star basketball player and WBA Championship MVP 
 Gary Patterson, Texas Christian University head football coach
 Ron Prince, Kansas State University head football coach
 Darrin Simmons, Cincinnati Bengals special teams coordinator
 Steve Tasker, NFL special teams player, winner of the 1993 Pro Bowl Most Valuable Player Award, sports announcer for CBS

Athletic Hall of Fame
The DCCC Athletic Hall of Fame has honored outstanding career contributors to Dodge City Community College Athletics.

References

External links
 

 
Sports teams in Kansas